Janet Dawson (born October 31, 1949) is an American writer of mysteries. Thirteen of her novels comprise the Jeri Howard series, featuring a private eye of the same name, and three make up the California Zephyr series featuring private eye Jill McLeod. Dawson's work has included many short stories and a mystery novel, What You Wish For, that is not part of either series. Dawson's Kindred Crimes was named a "best first private-eye novel" by St. Martin's Press and the Private Eye Writer's Association in 1990, and in 2004, her short story, "Voice Mail", won a Macavity Award.

Dawson, a graduate of the University of Colorado, Boulder (B.S. in journalism), began her writing career as a reporter for the Daily News of Lamar, Colorado (1972–74). She served in the United States Navy (1975–83), where she rose to the rank of lieutenant. During these same years, she completed work for an M.A. in history at California State University, Hayward, graduating in 1983. From then through 1995, she was a legal secretary for Safeway Inc., thereafter becoming a full-time writer.

Critical reception
Pearl G. Aldrich, in St. James Guide to Crime and Mystery Writers, praises Dawson for creating a strong central character, Jeri Howard, "an independent woman who chooses her own destiny and fights her own battles", for her main series of novels. The overall quality of that series, she says, is high. Though she finds Dawson's writing style "pedestrian ... and plodding", the private eye is "appealing and her cases interesting."

Of Dawson's first Jeri Howard novel, Kindred Crimes, Publishers Weekly says, "Dawson keeps suspense and interest at high pitch even for readers who correctly distinguish the guilty and innocent." The magazine describes as "workmanlike" her most recent novel in the series, The Devil Close Behind, concluding that "This love letter to New Orleans has a great sense of place, which compensates in part for a mystery with few surprises. Series fans will best appreciate this one."

Lauren Miller, writing for the Historical Novel Society, praises Dawson for the "extensive research into train life" that informs Death Rides the Zephyr. This detail includes "every aspect of being a Zephyrette [train stewardess], from dealing with rude customers to the ticket colors used when scheduling luncheon and the dinner hour." However, Miller says, "The well-detailed nature of the piece does affect the pacing, which at times feels slow...".

Bibliography
Jeri Howard series
Kindred Crimes (1990) 
Till the Old Men Die (1993) 
Take a Number (1993) 
Don't Turn Your Back on the Ocean (1994) 
Nobody's Child (1995) 
A Credible Threat (1996) 
Witness to Evil (1997) 
Where the Bodies Are Buried (1998) 
A Killing at the Track (2000) 
Bit Player (2011) 
Cold Trail (2015) 
Water Signs (2017) 
The Devil Close Behind (2019) 

California Zephyr series
 Death Rides the Zephyr (2013)
 Death Deals a Hand (2016) 
 The Ghost in Roomette Four (2018) 

Short stories
 What the Cat Dragged In (2002)
 Scam and Eggs (2011) 

Other
 What You Wish For: A Novel of Suspense (2012)

References

1949 births
20th-century American women writers
American crime fiction writers
American historical fiction writers
University of Colorado Boulder alumni
California State University, East Bay alumni
Writers from Oklahoma
Living people
Macavity Award winners
21st-century American women